Albert Ernest Taylor (2 June 1911 – 30 May 1978) was an Australian rules footballer who played for the Melbourne Football Club in the Victorian Football League (VFL).

Family
The son of Joseph Thomas Taylor (1873-1947), and Mary Christina Taylor (1874-1948), née Detlefsen, Albert Ernest Taylor was born at Corowa, New South Wales on 2 June 1911.

He married Lesley Mary Trewick in 1944.

Football

Melbourne (VFL)
Taylor was a tall (6ft 7in), left-footed ruckman, recruited from the Finley Football Club in the Murray Football League.
"With a dozen or more places to be filled through the omission of men who played last year, Melbourne officials are giving due attention to the form of their numerous recruits.Already some new men have been struck off the list, and the selection committee will act again when they meet after witnessing the form displayed in the two practice matches to be played tomorrow.Apart from his physique, the outstanding recruit with the Fuschias is Bert Taylor, the giant from Finley, New South Wales. He has not the same awkward movements as some six-footers, and is able to unwind great pace and combine high marking and clever ground play. He should be useful in any key position, as he could be placed on the ball, half-forward or half-back, and acquit himself equally as well." — The Herald, 6 April 1934.

VFL Representative team
In 1935, he played in three VFL representative matches: against Western Australia on 22 June 1935, against Western Australia on 25 June 1935, and against South Australia on 29 June 1935.
Bert Taylor, centre half-forward for Melbourne (24, 6.4, 15.10, 18 games) is the tallest and heaviest man in League football. He came from the Riverina last year, and has quickly made his mark. A left footer, he is remarkably on the ground for a man of his height, which, however, he does not use to the best advantage in going for marks. He has also followed with success, and should be one of the best in the side." — The West Australian, 19 June, 1935.

Military service
Taylor enlisted in the  Australian Militia in February 1942. He was discharged in December 1942, on the grounds that, as a farmer, he had a reserved occupation.

Death
He died (suddenly) at his residence in Bendigo, Victoria, on 30 May 1978.

Notes

References
 Giant for Melbourne, The Weekly Times, (Saturday, 14 April 1934), p.60.
 Holmesby, Russell & Main, Jim (2009), The Encyclopedia of AFL Footballers: every AFL/VFL player since 1897 (8th ed.), Seaford, Victoria: BAS Publishing. 
 World War Two Nominal Roll: Trooper Albert Ernest Taylor (V24549), Department of Veterans' Affairs.
 World War Two Service Record: Trooper Albert Ernest Taylor (V24549), National Archives of Australia.

External links 

 
 
 Bert Taylor, at Demonwiki.

1911 births
1978 deaths
Australian rules footballers from New South Wales
Melbourne Football Club players
Finley Football Club players